Unicom Corporation was an American energy holding company formed in 1994 from Commonwealth Edison after executives considered a corporate image makeover. The holding company merged with PECO Energy Company on October 23, 2000 to form Exelon.

History
Unicom Corporation was formed in 1994 after energy company Commonwealth Edison executives focused on a corporate image makeover. Unicom's primary subsidiary, Commonwealth Edison, focused on the production, purchase, transmission, distribution, and sale of electricity to residential, commercial, industrial, and wholesale customers. James J. O'Connor was CEO and chairman of the company from 1994 to 1998.

In 1997, after pending compromise to deregulate the electric utility industry, Unicom announced its intention to reenter the natural gas industry, an industry it left in 1954 following the spin off of Northern Illinois Gas Company. O'Connor stepped down as CEO in 1998 due to under-performance and was replaced by John W. Rowe who assumed the position of CEO, chairman and president of the company.

In September 1999, Unicom announced a planned $16 billion merger with PECO Energy Company. The merger was completed on October 23, 2000 and formed Exelon Corporation. The merger was one of the largest at the time. After the merger, Exelon maintained the largest collection of nuclear plants in the United States and became among the nation's largest electric utilities company, generating more than $12 billion in annual revenues.

References

External links
Bloomberg company profile

Defunct energy companies of the United States
Electric power companies of the United States
Defunct companies based in Chicago
Non-renewable resource companies established in 1994
Non-renewable resource companies disestablished in 2000
Natural gas companies of the United States
Nuclear power companies of the United States
American companies established in 1994